= Salmon University =

Fishing website

- Website type: Salmon fishing
- Available in: English
- Founded: 2002
- Area served: Pacific Northwest
- Website: salmonuniversity.com

Salmon University is a recreational fishing website that provides news, instruction, and other information related to angling in Alaska, British Columbia, Oregon, and Washington. The site was launched in 2002 and operated by John Keizer and Tom Nelson until 2008, when Nelson bought Keizer's stake.
